Daniel Gallagher (September 6, 1896 – May 6, 1956) was the Sheriff of the City and County of San Francisco from 1952–56.  During his tenure he fought for prison reform and higher pay for women employees.    Prior to being appointed Sheriff, he was a member of the San Francisco Board of Supervisors.

Gallagher also served as a member of the California State Assembly for the 23rd district from 1939 to 1942.

References

External links 
 Biography on the Sheriff's Department website

California sheriffs
1896 births
1956 deaths
San Francisco Board of Supervisors members
20th-century American politicians
Democratic Party members of the California State Assembly